Chromatin modification-related protein MEAF6 is a protein that in humans is encoded by the MEAF6 gene.

References

Further reading